"Chacun Tout Le Monde" ("Each One Everyone") is the first album released by French pop group Oui Oui on Eurobond Records in 1989. It was released on 12" vinyl under the YABA Music and Just'In Distribution labels, and is currently out of print. Personnel include Étienne Charry (guitar/vocals,) Michel Gondry (drummer,) Nicolas Dufournet (bassist) and Gilles Chapat (keyboards.) Tracks one and two, "Les Cailloux" and "Ma Maison," respectively, were both made into music videos by drummer and filmmaker Michel Gondry, though the version of "Ma Maison" used for the video differs markedly from the LP version.

The cover art features marionette caricatures of the four band members, and is the same visual style used in the music video for the first track, "Les Cailloux."  The marionettes and art were created by Frédérique Petit and Fabrice Moireau, and was photographed by Jean-Louise Leibovitch. The concept was by Oui Oui-Le Village.

Track listing
SIDE A (20:39)

"Les cailloux" ("The Pebbles") – 2:37
"Ma maison" ("My House") – 2:02
"Toc toc" ("Knock Knock") – 2:56
"Les géants des bois" ("Giants of the Woods") – 3:02
"Derrière leur nez" ("Behind Their Nose") – 2:24
"La croisière" ("The Cruise") – 2:03
"Il mâchait" ("He Chewed") – 3:28
"Serrons les coudes" ("Let Us Tighten Our Elbows") – 2:07

SIDE B (21:32)

"Partir à L'aube" ("To Leave at Dawn") – 3:04
"Un loup sous le lit" ("A Wolf Under the Bed") – 3:38
"Mac pichney" ("Mac Pichney") – 2:08
"Petit mimosa" ("Small Mimosa") – 2:06
"Plum pudding" – 3:12
"Où vont les poussières" ("Where Dust Goes") – 3:12
"Ils n'maiment plus" ("They don't like me anymore") – 2:34
"Bonne nuit" ("Good Night") – 1:38

Personnel
Primary band

Étienne Charry – Lead guitar, Lead vocals
Michel Gondry – Drums and percussion
Nicolas Dufournet – Bass guitar
Gilles Chapat – Keyboards

Secondary players

Catherine Arnoux-Bruno Lhuissier – Violins
Carlos Dourthe – Violoncello
Marie-Noëlle Gondry – Flute
Jean-Louise Bompoint – Bugle, trumpet, vibraphone
Grand Magasin – Choruses
Frédérique Petit – Piano
Abraham Sirinix – Trombone (with the pleasant authorisation of O.T.T.)
Twist – Trumpet
Anne-Marie, Francis et Luca – Claps

External links
"Oui Oui ·· Un joyeaux noel, Junior et sa voix d'or, Bolide" at director-file.com

1989 albums